Moussa Sidi Bagayoko (born 31 December 1983) is a Mauritanian footballer who plays as a midfielder for Concorde and the Mauritania national team.

International career
Bagayoko made his debut for Mauritania on 3 September 2006 against Botswana.

Career statistics

International
Statistics accurate as of match played 13 January 2018

Honours 
Ligue 1 Mauritania: winner (2016–17)

References

External links
 

1983 births
Living people
Mauritanian footballers
Mauritania international footballers
Association football midfielders
Mauritania A' international footballers
2018 African Nations Championship players